Presika  may refer to:

 Presika, Slovenia, a village in Slovenia
 Presika, Primorje-Gorski Kotar County, a village in Croatia
 Presika, Istria County, a village in Croatia